Aloysia is a genus  of flowering plants in the verbena family, Verbenaceae. They are known generally as beebrushes. They are native to the Americas, where they are distributed in temperate climates, as well as in subtropical and desert climates. The genus is named for Maria Luisa of Parma (1751-1819), wife of King Charles IV of Spain.

Description
These plants are subshrubs, shrubs, or trees growing 0.5 meters to 15 meters tall. Many are very aromatic. The stems may be four-angled and smooth when new, becoming more angular or rounded and often furrowed or striated with age. The leaves are evergreen or deciduous in the dry season. They are often oppositely arranged or whorled, but can be alternate or clustered. The blades are variable in shape, toothed or smooth-edged, and hairless to rough-haired on the upper surfaces. The undersides may have glandular hairs. The inflorescence is usually a raceme of widely spaced clusters of 3 to 6 flowers each. There are leaflike bracts under the flowers which can be showy in some species. The calyx of sepals has 2 or 4 lobes and is persistent, enclosing the fruit as it develops. The flower corolla is tubular with a wider mouth divided into four lobes, one of which may be cleft. The corolla can be white, purplish, blue, or pink. The narrow style is tipped with a bilobed stigma and there are 4 stamens. The fruit is a schizocarp.

Diversity

There are about 30 species.

Species include: 
Aloysia arequipensis
Aloysia barbata
Aloysia brasiliensis
Aloysia castellanosii
Aloysia catamarcensis
Aloysia chamaedryfolia
Aloysia chiapensis
 Aloysia citrodora Paláu – lemon verbena, lemon beebrush
Aloysia coalcomana
Aloysia cordata
Aloysia crenata
 Aloysia dodsoniorum Moldenke
Aloysia dusenii
Aloysia fiebrigii
Aloysia gratissima(Gillies & Hook.) Tronc. – common beebrush, whitebrush, whitebush 
Aloysia hatschbachii
Aloysia herrerae
Aloysia lycioides Cham.
 Aloysia macrostachya (Torr.) Moldenke – Rio Grande beebrush
Aloysia minthiosa
Aloysia nahuire
Aloysia oblanceolata
Aloysia peruviana
Aloysia polygalifolia
Aloysia polystachya(Grisebach & Moldenke) – burro, burrito, ka'á jaguá
Aloysia salviifolia
Aloysia scorodonioides
Aloysia sonorensis
Aloysia velutina
 Aloysia virgata (Ruiz & Pav.) Pers. – almond verbena
 Aloysia wrightii (A.Gray) A.Heller – mintbush lippia, Wright's beebrush

Formerly placed here
 Mulguraea ligustrina (as A. ligustrina (Lag.) Small)

References

 
Verbenaceae genera
Taxonomy articles created by Polbot